Geoffrey Parker may refer to:
 Geoff Parker (born 1944), British professor of biology
 Geoffrey Parker (historian) (born 1943), British historian
 Geoff Parker (cricketer) (born 1968), Australian cricketer
 Geoffrey G. Parker (born 1963), American professor of management science

See also
Jeff Parker (disambiguation)